Charles Robert Dudley Wooler (30 June 1930 – 26 April 2017) was a first-class cricketer who played for Leicestershire County Cricket Club in England and the Rhodesia cricket team which competed in the Currie Cup.

Wooler born in Bulawayo, Southern Rhodesia. He was a right-arm fast-medium pace bowler and started his first-class career at Leicestershire. After making his debut in a non-championship match against Northamptonshire in 1949, he earned a regular spot in the team for the 1950 County Championship season. He finished the summer with 54 wickets at 31.31. His average would have been better had he not bowled in a match against the touring West Indians, who amassed 2/682 declared in their first innings. Frank Worrell and Everton Weekes both scored double hundreds while teammate Roy Marshall fell for 188. Wooler took 0/103 from his 28 overs.

He took exactly 50 wickets the following summer, at a slightly better average of 28.20. His 100th first-class wicket was that of Kent all-rounder Alan Shirreff. When the summer ended, Wooler traveled to Rhodesia and represented their team in the 1951/52 Currie Cup. He managed 23 wickets at 32.34 in first-class matches for Rhodesia, with perhaps the biggest of those scalps being his last, Denis Compton of the Marylebone Cricket Club.

References

External links

1930 births
2017 deaths
Cricketers from Bulawayo
Zimbabwean people of British descent
White Rhodesian people
Zimbabwean cricketers
Rhodesia cricketers
Leicestershire cricketers